Jennifer Wong is a writer and poet from Hong Kong.

Biography
An alumnus of the Diocesan Girls' School, Wong studied English literature at University College, Oxford. Between 2001 and 2005 she worked for the Hong Kong government as an administration officer, and later as a PR executive in the private sector.

She gained an MA in creative writing at the University of East Anglia, and a PhD in creative writing at Oxford Brookes University,
. She taught poetry at the Chinese University of Hong Kong and worked as poet-in-residence at Lingnan University. Currently she lectures at Oxford Brookes University and Poetry School.
 
She published her first collection of poems, Summer Cicadas in 2006, which focused on her time in England. In 2013 she published her second collection, Goldfish, which focused more on Hong Kong. Her third collection, Letters Home 
 
 
published by Nine Arches Press in the UK in 2020, has been named the Wild Card Choice by the Poetry Book Society in the UK.  

In 2014, she received the Hong Kong Young Artist Award (Literary Arts) presented by Hong Kong Arts Development Council. Her work has also been featured in Tate Etc., the Frogmore Papers, Cha: An Asian Literary Journal, Aesthetica and Prairie Schooner.

Currently living in London, Wong represented Hong Kong at the 2012 Cultural Olympiad held in the city, and has been a speaker at the Hong Kong International Literary Festival
and the Hong Kong Young Readers Festival in 2014.

References

Hong Kong poets
Hong Kong women writers
Hong Kong writers
Alumni of University College, Oxford
Alumni of the University of East Anglia
Academic staff of the Chinese University of Hong Kong
Academic staff of Lingnan University
2012 Cultural Olympiad
Living people
Year of birth missing (living people)
Chinese women poets